Exile on Mainstream is the first compilation album by American rock band Matchbox Twenty. The album was released in two parts: the first was an EP, featuring seven new songs that emerged from a 12-song recording session, produced by Steve Lillywhite. The other part consists of remastered versions of 11 of the band's biggest hits.

Recording
Matchbox Twenty had been on hiatus since 2005, when Adam Gaynor had left the band. In 2007, the remaining four group members reunited in Los Angeles to do a compilation album, and ended up recording seven new songs over the course of one session. For the first time, every member of the group worked on songwriting. All seven of the new songs on the album were credited to the members of Matchbox Twenty, a first for the group. Prior to this, the songs either were credited to Rob Thomas himself or co-written with various members of the band. Paul Doucette, originally the band's drummer, played rhythm guitar due to Adam Gaynor's departure.

The album's title is a reference to the Rolling Stones' Exile on Main St.

Release
The album was available for pre-order on September 4, 2007 from iTunes. The full album was released on VH1's "The Leak" one week before release. It leaked onto the Internet on September 28, 2007, four days ahead of the official release date. The album was released on October 2, 2007, exactly 11 years and one day since the release of the band's debut album, Yourself or Someone Like You. The album debuted on the Australian ARIA Albums Chart on October 8, 2007 at number-one with sales of 18,199 units. In the U.S., the album debuted at number-three on the Billboard 200 chart, selling 131,000 copies in its first week. The album was released in a USB wristband format as well as the 2-CD edition making Matchbox Twenty the first band to do so.

The first single, "How Far We've Come", was released on July 16, 2007, and charted in the top 10 in Australia and in the top 20 in the United States. Paul Doucette announced in mid-October that "These Hard Times" would be released as the album's second single in early 2008. In Australia, "All Your Reasons" was released as the second single instead of "These Hard Times", and the single is available on the Australian iTunes Store.

The album has sold 660,319 copies as of June 7, 2008 and was certified gold in the United States.

Track listing

Exile On Mainstream Revisited

Personnel
Rob Thomas – lead vocals, piano, acoustic guitar
Kyle Cook – lead guitar, backing vocals
Adam Gaynor – rhythm guitar and backing vocals on Disc 2
Paul Doucette – drums on Disc 2, rhythm guitar and backing vocals on Disc 1
Brian Yale – bass
Ryan MacMillan – drums on Disc 1

Charts

Weekly charts

Year-end charts

Certifications

References

2007 greatest hits albums
Albums produced by Matt Serletic
Albums produced by Steve Lillywhite
Atlantic Records compilation albums
Matchbox Twenty albums